The Cameroon sailfin chameleon or Cameroon two-horned mountain chameleon (Trioceros montium) is a species of chameleon endemic to Cameroon. It has a very unusual appearance.

Distribution and habitat
The Cameroon sailfin chameleon is found only in the Cameroonian highlands around Mount Cameroon. Because it is almost entirely restricted to rainforests ranging from 700 to 1900 meters above sea level, it is estimated only a few locations support populations of the species. However, it has also been found in small farms and gardens.

Description
It is usually green, but males often turn blue when on display. Distinguishing features on males include two large horns just above the upper jaw which are used for jousting and a prominent dorsal "sail". The males can grow up to ten inches or 30 centimeters long and the females can grow up to eight inches long.

References

Trioceros
Lizards of Africa
Endemic fauna of Cameroon
Reptiles of Cameroon
Reptiles described in 1874
Taxa named by Reinhold Wilhelm Buchholz